Seveso Directive may refer to:
Directive 82/501/EC, Seveso Directive I (1982)
Directive 96/82/EC, Seveso Directive II (1996)
Directive 2012/18/EU, Seveso Directive III (2012)

See also
 Seveso disaster